Monty Desai is an Indian-born professional cricket coach who is currently the head coach of Nepal national team. 

He began his coaching career with Andhra cricket team, where he led the team in 2018–19 season of Ranji Trophy. Later, he joined Afghanistan national team in 2018 and United Arab Emirates national team as a batting coach in 2019. He was appointed head coach of Cananda national team for 2019 ICC World Cricket League Division Two. 

In 2019, he then joined West Indies national team as a batting coach, and served until 2021. He was also part of the Indian Premier League franchise Rajasthan Royals and Gujarat Lions as a performance coach and talent scout. In 2023, he was appointed head coach of Nepal national team by Cricket Association of Nepal, and led the team to qualify for the 2023 Cricket World Cup Qualifier as well as to successfully retained the ODI status.

References

External links
 
 

Coaches of the Canada national cricket team
Coaches of the Nepal national cricket team
Coaches of the West Indies cricket team
Coaches of the United Arab Emirates national cricket team
Coaches of the Afghanistan national cricket team
Living people
People from Mumbai
Indian cricket coaches